Amar otra vez (Loving again) is a Mexican telenovela produced by Lucero Suárez for Televisa in 2004. Starring Irán Castillo and Valentino Lanús with Rafael Amaya, Margarita Magaña, Roberto Ballesteros and Vanessa Guzman, in addition to its cast in Mexico's Sweetheart Angélica María as a suffering mother.

Cast

Music

 Song: Tu fotografía
 Writers: Gloria Estefan and G. Marco
 Singer: Gloria Estefan

Mexican Edition:
 Song: No es amor
 Singer: Enrique Iglesias

External links
Official website 

2004 telenovelas
Mexican telenovelas
2004 Mexican television series debuts
2004 Mexican television series endings
Spanish-language telenovelas
Televisa telenovelas